Eric Schweig (born Ray Dean Thrasher; 19 June 1967) is an Indigenous Canadian actor best known for his role as Chingachgook's son Uncas in The Last of the Mohicans (1992).

Early life
Schweig was born in Inuvik, Northwest Territories. He is of mixed race (Inuvialuk, Chippewa-Dene and German). He is the oldest of seven children, who were all adopted out as part of the Canadian government's failed attempt at forcing Inuit and First Nations children to assimilate into white society. Schweig's biological mother died of alcoholism in 1989. He never met her. "She didn’t drink a drop of alcohol until we were taken away," says Schweig. "We were part of the whole assimilation program—forcibly taken away, although my adoptive parents told me I wasn't." Schweig was adopted at six months of age by an English-speaking German-French family. He spent his childhood in Inuvik until he was six, when his family moved to Bermuda. They later moved back to Canada.

"I eventually grew tired of living in a prison without walls and ran away when I was 16. What transpired between then and now has been a roller coaster of alcohol, drugs, violence, failed relationships, despair and confusion. Who am I? Where do I come from? Where is my family? Where do I belong? When life's mystery has been shattered by strangers watching over you, a lot of these questions are lost."

Schweig ran away to Toronto, Ontario, where he supported himself by framing houses. In 1985, he was part of the cast of The Cradle Will Fall, an experimental adaptation of Frank Wedekind's Spring Awakening produced by Theatre of Change at the Actor's Lab; this was his first experience as an actor. In 1987, at twenty years old, he was approached by a producer who suggested he audition for a role in the movie called The Shaman's Source (1990). With little formal education or experience he won the role. The film launched his career in the film industry.

Career
Schweig's numerous screen credits (over thirty) include his portrayal of Uncas in the epic motion picture  The Last of the Mohicans (1992) and Pike Dexter in the movie Big Eden (2000), for which he won the Grand Jury Prize at the Outfest film festival. In 1992, he was cast as Black Thunder in the Canadian Broadcasting Corporation mini-series By Way of the Stars. Among his period film credits since The Last of the Mohicans, Eric became the famous Mohawk leader Joseph Brant/Thayendanegea for TNT's telefilm The Broken Chain (1993), playing for the first time the main character in a movie (Schweig appeared with Wes Studi again for this motion picture). It was shot primarily in North Carolina. He starred in Disney's The Scarlet Letter and Tom and Huck with Amy Wright in 1995. In 1996 he appeared as a Comanche protagonist, Buffalo Hump, in the Larry McMurtry miniseries Dead Man's Walk. More recently, he played the lead role in films addressing more contemporary issues facing aboriginal and Native American people: Skins (2002), Cowboys and Indians: The J.J. Harper Story (2003) and One Dead Indian (2006).

Personal life
During the 1990s, Schweig began carving masks as a natural extension of his artistic expression.  Since his childhood, Eric found he was emotionally pre-disposed to carving small objects out of wood (figures, kayak, etc.). Under the tutelage of artist Vern Etzerza, he studied traditional Pacific Coast carving before directing his talent specifically towards custom and traditional Inuit Spirit Masks, in collaboration with master carver Art Thompson. His collection of masks are not only successful attempts to reconnect with his heritage and with Inuit art, but his carvings are also necessary labours of psychological resilience facing a traumatized childhood. As a disastrous consequence of this uprooting and abuse, Schweig struggled for many years with alcohol abuse. He has stated that Big Eden (2000) was the first movie in which he was entirely sober. His fame as an actor gives him the opportunity to share his life's experience in numerous speaking engagements in Canada and the United States of America. He is able to make large audiences aware of aboriginal issues, including adoption, the foster care system, addictions, and suicide. He currently resides in Vancouver BC working at Vancouver Native Health's "Positive Outlook" program where residents of the city's downtown eastside who are HIV positive can gain access to health care, hot meals, and social programming to maintain community connections.

In 2017, Eric adopted two foster siblings. When asked about the transition to fostering, Eric said, "I went from 30 years of bachelorhood to Mr. Mom overnight. Everything changed, I went from only having to consider myself for every decision to centering everything on my foster kids. It was a real 180". Eric now lives in Vancouver with his son and daughter.

Awards
2000 - Grand Jury Award L.A. Outfest, Outstanding Actor in a Feature Film for Big Eden
2008 - Honorary Doctorate of Education from Nipissing University
2011 - Nomination for a Leo Award for Best Lead Performance by a Male in a Dramatic Series for his role as corrupt band Chief Andy Fraser in the TV series Blackstone.

Others
In 1993, he came in 5th on People magazine's 50 Most Beautiful People list.

Filmography

References

External links
 
 http://www.mohicanpress.com/eric_schweig_gallery.html

1967 births
Canadian adoptees
Canadian male film actors
Canadian male television actors
Canadian male voice actors
Canadian people of German descent
Canadian people of Inuit descent
People from Renfrew County
People from Inuvik
Living people
Inuit male actors
Male actors from the Northwest Territories
Inuvialuit people
Inuit from the Northwest Territories